HD 3346, also known as V428 Andromedae, is a binary star system in the northern constellation of Andromeda. It is a dim star but visible to the naked eye under suitable viewing conditions, having an apparent visual magnitude of 5.14. This yields a range of about 660 light year. At that distance the brightness of the system is diminished by an extinction of 0.16 magnitude due to interstellar dust. It is moving closer to the Earth with a heliocentric radial velocity of −33 km/s.

Binary system
This is a single-lined spectroscopic binary system with an orbital period of 576 days and an eccentricity of 0.3. The provides a minimum value for the actual semimajor axis.

The visible component is a red giant star and has been defined as a standard star for the stellar classification of K6 IIIa.  Prior to that there had been no spectral standard for K6 giants and HD 3346 had been classified between K5 III and M0 III.

Variability
V428 Andromedae is the variable star designation for HD 3346. It is a short-period semi-regular variable (type SRS), also called an ultra-small-amplitude pulsating red giant.  It has an amplitude of only 0.065 magnitudes.  The main pulsation period is 11.5 days, but other periods of 11, 15, and 22 days have been detected.

Possible planetary system 
In 1996 it was announced that the variations in radial velocity of this star were larger than expected. A planetary system was proposed to explain this variation.

References

External links 
 

K-type giants
Short period semiregular variable
Hypothetical planetary systems
Andromeda (constellation)
Durchmusterung objects
003346
002900
0152
Andromedae, V428
Spectroscopic binaries